John Moore (born 18 May 1933) is a British skier. He competed at the 1956 Winter Olympics, the 1960 Winter Olympics and the 1964 Winter Olympics.

References

External links
 

1933 births
Living people
British male biathletes
British male cross-country skiers
Olympic biathletes of Great Britain
Olympic cross-country skiers of Great Britain
Biathletes at the 1960 Winter Olympics
Biathletes at the 1964 Winter Olympics
Cross-country skiers at the 1956 Winter Olympics
Cross-country skiers at the 1960 Winter Olympics
Cross-country skiers at the 1964 Winter Olympics
Sportspeople from Aldershot